Semiway is an unincorporated community located in McLean County, Kentucky, United States.

It is reportedly named for being located at a "semi" distance between Calhoun and Sacramento.

References

Unincorporated communities in McLean County, Kentucky
Unincorporated communities in Kentucky